Ħal Far is the largest industrial estate in Malta. It is at the southern extreme of Malta, between the localities of Birżebbuġa, Safi and Żurrieq.

In the past, Ħal Far housed the RAF Hal Far airfield, which was known as HMS Falcon when in the service of the Royal Navy.  The airfield was also used in 1954 and 1955 by the US Navy Squadron VP-11 for a tour of six months each year. VP-11 had a complement of 12 aircraft stationed there. The enlisted personnel lived in Quonset huts located within walking distance of the airport. 

The runway can still be seen and driven on, leaving Maltese drag racers to use it for drag car racing. Parts of the airfield including the hangar have been converted into detention centres for refugees and asylum seekers.

In this area, one can also find the historical Ħasan Cave, the Wardija Tower and the second largest Playmobil factory in the world.

References

Industrial parks in Malta
Birżebbuġa